Douglas Thomas Anakin (November 6, 1930 – April 25, 2020) was a Canadian bobsleigh competitor. He was born in Chatham, Ontario and was selected by Vic Emery as a member of Canada's gold medal-winning four-man bobsleigh team at the 1964 Winter Olympics. Anakin was also one of the driving forces behind the Canadian luge program. He was inducted into Canada's Sports Hall of Fame and the Canadian Olympic Hall of Fame.

Anakin taught for 19 years at John Abbott College in Sainte-Anne-de-Bellevue before retiring in 1990. Because of his involvement at the school, his commitment to his community, and his passion for outdoor activities, the school established the "Doug Anakin Scholarship for Outdoor Pursuits" which is presented annually to a student who best demonstrates Anakin's traits.

Anakin owned Doug Anakin Sports in Beaconsfield, a store specializing in outdoor sport equipment.

Anakin was married and had two children and four grandchildren. He died in Invermere, British Columbia in 2020 at the age of 89.

References

 Anakin family tree
 Bobsleigh four-man Olympic medalists for 1924, 1932-56, and since 1964
 DatabaseOlympics.com profile

External links
 
 
 

1930 births
2020 deaths
Bobsledders at the 1964 Winter Olympics
Lugers at the 1964 Winter Olympics
Canadian male bobsledders
Canadian male lugers
Sportspeople from Chatham-Kent
Olympic bobsledders of Canada
Olympic gold medalists for Canada
Sledding sportspeople from Ontario
Olympic medalists in bobsleigh
Medalists at the 1964 Winter Olympics